The Dresden Soul Symphony is a live album by The Dresden Soul Symphony, released October 24, 2008. The musicians reinterpret soul hits and combine them with classical music. The musical ensemble includes vocals from Joy Denalane, Bilal, Dwele and Tweet, the MDR Symphony Orchestra and conducted by Jun Märkl.

Track listing
"Prelude" - 3:39
"Midnight Train to Georgia" - 3:57
Joy Denalane, Bilal, Dwele and Tweet
"I Thank You" - 2:16
Bilal and Dwele
"Take Me to the River" - 2:53
Dwele
"(You Make Me Feel Like) A Natural Woman" - 3:08
Joy Denalane
"I Got a Woman" - 2:33
Bilal
"Lovin' You" - 3:51
Tweet
"Midnight Train to Georgia (Reprise)" - 1:15
Joy Denalane, Bilal, Dwele and Tweet
"I'm Coming Out" - 1:40
"A Song for You" - 1:40
Joy Denalane
"You're All I Need to Get By" - 3:18
Joy Denalane and Bilal
"Let's Stay Together" - 2:22
Dwele
"It's a Man's Man's Man's World" - 2:08
Joy Denalane and Tweet
"Me and Mrs. Jones" - 3:12
Dwele
"Betcha by Golly Wow!" - 3:48
Tweet
"I'll Take You There" - 2:47
Tweet and Dwele
"ABC" - 2:30
Joy Denalane, Bilal, Dwele and Tweet
"Sir Duke" - 2:43
Bilal
"Everything Is Everything" - 3:00
Joy Denalane
"Prelude Reprise" - 2:28
"Master Blaster" - 2:55
Bilal
"Love's Theme" - 2:12
"T.S.O.P." - 1:54
"Love Train" - 2:30
Bilal
"Ain't No Stoppin' Us Now" - 3:16
Joy Denalane, Bilal, Dwele and Tweet
"Midnight Train to Georgia (Finale)" - 2:53
Joy Denalane, Bilal, Dwele and Tweet

Personnel
Joy Denalane - vocals
Bilal - vocals
Dwele - vocals
Tweet - vocals
MDR Symphony Orchestra
Jun Märkl - conductor

References

2008 live albums
Bilal (American singer) albums
Dwele albums
Joy Denalane albums
Tweet (singer) albums